Gustavo Paruolo (born November 16, 1980 in Buenos Aires) is a retired Argentine football player who last played for River Plate Puerto Rico in the USL Professional Division.

Paruolo started his career with San Lorenzo. In 2001, he left San Lorenzo and spent several years playing in the lower leagues of Argentine football with Almagro, Juventud Antoniana,  Los Andes, All Boys, Nueva Chicago and La Plata FC.

In 2006 Paruolo joined Audax Italiano in Chile before moving to Romania to play for Politehnica Iaşi.

External links
 Gustavo Paruolo at BDFA.com.ar 
 
 

1980 births
Living people
Footballers from Buenos Aires
Argentine footballers
Argentine expatriate footballers
Club Almagro players
Club Atlético Los Andes footballers
Nueva Chicago footballers
All Boys footballers
Audax Italiano footballers
Expatriate footballers in Chile
Expatriate footballers in Colombia
Expatriate footballers in Romania
Liga I players
Club Atlético River Plate Puerto Rico players
USL Championship players
Categoría Primera A players
Association football midfielders